Aland Rural District is in Safayyeh District of Khoy County, West Azerbaijan province, Iran. At the National Census of 2006, its population was 7,160 in 1,273 households. There were 8,511 inhabitants in 1,837 households at the following census of 2011. At the most recent census of 2016, the population of the rural district was 7,071 in 1,555 households. The largest of its 23 villages was Dizaj-e Aland, with 1,249 people.

References 

Khoy County

Rural Districts of West Azerbaijan Province

Populated places in West Azerbaijan Province

Populated places in Khoy County